The 2006–07 Saudi Premier League was the 31st Saudi Professional League season and the last to feature the Golden Four format. Al-Shabab were the defending champions, but they were eliminated by Al-Wahda in the first stage of the Golden Four. Al-Ittihad, who finished second with a 5-point difference from first place Al-Hilal, went on to win the league 2–1 in Riyadh. Hamad Al-Montashari's header gave Al-Ittihad their 7th league title in the 94th minute of the match.

Qualification and Prize Money

Prize Money:

 First Place: 2.5 million Saudi riyals
 Second Place: 1.5 million Saudi riyals
 Third Place: 1 million Saudi riyals

Stadia and locations

Final league table

Golden Four Stage 1

Golden Four Stage 2

Final

Results

Season progress

Season statistics

Top scorers

References

 goalzz.com

External links
 RSSSF Stats
 Saudi Arabia Football Federation
 Saudi League Statistics

Saudi Premier League seasons
2006–07 in Saudi Arabian football
Saudi Professional League